The Ratzinger Report is a 1985 book consisting of a series of interviews collected over several days given by Joseph Cardinal Ratzinger to the Italian journalist Vittorio Messori. The book focuses on the state of the Roman Catholic Church after the Second Vatican Council. The book is very critical of the "hermeneutic of rupture" associated with the liberal "spirit of Vatican II" within the Church. It has often been reread in the context of the papacy of Pope Benedict XVI in order to better understand the mind and the thinking of the former pontiff.

Topics
 The true Spirit and letter of Vatican II 
 The Church as God's Church, not the laity Church 
 The nature of the priesthood 
 The papacy, the episcopacy, and the role of bishops' conferences. 
 Liberalism, relativism and the permissiveness of modern society 
 The role of women 
 Six reasons not to forget the Blessed Virgin Mary 
 Spirituality for today 
 The dignity of the liturgy, the eucharist as the heart of faith, and the difference between solemnity and triumphalism 
 The devil, the angels, purgatory, and limbo 
 Ecumenism and Christian unity 
 Liberation theology, Marxism and capitalism 
 Evangelization and why Jesus is the only Savior

References
Citations

Bibliography

External links
 The Ratzinger Report (Google Books)
 The Ratzinger Report (Ignatius Press)

Second Vatican Council
Pope Benedict XVI
1985 in Christianity
1985 non-fiction books
Books of interviews
Ignatius Press books